Corallus hortulana, commonly known as the Amazon tree boa, common tree boa, garden tree boa, and macabrel, is a boa species found in South America. No subspecies are currently recognized. Like all boas, it is non-venomous.

Description
Adults grow to an average of 5 and 6.5 feet (1.5–2 m) in length. This species exhibits an immense variety of colors and patterns. The basic color can be anywhere from black, brown, or gray, to any shade of red, orange, yellow, or many colors in between. Some are totally patternless, while others may be speckled, banded, or saddled with rhomboid or chevron shapes. Some reds will have yellow patterns, some yellows red or orange patterns. Generally, there are two color 'phases' that are genetically inherited, but are not ontogenic as with the emerald tree boa (C. caninus) and the southern green tree python (Morelia viridis). The 'garden phase' refers to boas with drab coloration, mostly brown or olive, with varied patterning, while the 'colored phase' refers to animals with combinations of red, orange, and yellow coloring.

Geographic range
The range of Corallus hortulana extends through the Amazon rainforest of South America, including Brazil, Bolivia, Peru, Ecuador, Colombia, Venezuela, Guyana, Suriname, and French Guiana.  

Typically found below 300 m elevation. They can be found in a variety of habitats, but are strictly an arboreal species.

Captivity
While Amazon tree boas are encountered relatively frequently in the pet industry, they have a notoriously irritable temperament, do not hesitate to bite, and have very specific care requirements. As such, they are not recommended for inexperienced keepers.

References

Further reading

 Mattison C. 1999. Snake. DK Publishing. .

External links

 

hortulana
Snakes of South America
Reptiles of Bolivia
Reptiles of Brazil
Reptiles of Colombia
Reptiles of Ecuador
Reptiles of French Guiana
Reptiles of Guyana
Reptiles of Peru
Reptiles of Venezuela
Fauna of the Amazon
Reptiles described in 1758
Taxa named by Carl Linnaeus
Taxobox binomials not recognized by IUCN